Dean James Heffernan (born 19 May 1980) is a former professional football (soccer) player.

Club career
With the Central Coast Mariners he scored 8 goals from left back in 24 games and was subsequently named in FourFourTwo's A-League dream team. In March 2006, he and teammate Michael Beauchamp had a ten-day trial with German Bundesliga club Nürnberg. On 1 July 2006, both players transferred to Nürnberg on season-long loans. Heffernan  struggled to get senior games only appearing on the bench for the first team, although he played eight games in the reserves scoring five goals.

Heffernan suffered a broken leg during the Mariners 4–5 loss to Sydney FC on 22 December 2007, due to a tackle by Ufuk Talay. As a result, he was unable to play in the rest of the 2007–08 A-League season. Since returning from fracturing his tibia, he was selected twice for the Socceroos and was a stand out for his club the Mariners in their 2010 Asian Champions League campaign.

With the Central Coast Mariners in the 2009–10 he had another stand out season, where he was named in the PFA team of the year and Four Four Two team of the year. He also scored his first international goal for Australia against Kuwait. On 26 November 2009, Heffernan joined new A-league side, Melbourne Heart on a multi-year deal.

Huddersfield Town
Prior to joining Melbourne Heart, Heffernan joined English side Huddersfield Town in Football League One to help prepare for a World Cup call up for the Socceroos. He completed the deal on 28 January 2010 after receiving his international clearance. On 30 January 2010, he made his debut for the Terriers in their 1–0 win against Yeovil Town at Huish Park. His first home game for Huddersfield was in their 1–1 draw with Carlisle United. Heffernan's last game for the Terriers was in their 4–3 win over Walsall. After Town lost in the play-offs, Heffernan returned to Australia to join his new teammates at Melbourne Heart after making 15 appearances for the Terriers.

Melbourne Heart
At Heart, he played most games in the first half of the season, but after getting sent off, his position was covered by Aziz Behich and he was not included in the starting lineup for many games afterwards.

Perth Glory
On 25 February 2011, Heffernan moved to A-League side Perth Glory for the 2011–12 season. He planned to join Perth Glory for pre-season training in August after he had completed a short-term loan deal with Chinese Super League club Liaoning Whowin.

Liaoning Whowin
On 30 August 2011, it was announced Perth Glory had agreed to release Heffernan after the player decided he would like to remain with Liaoning Whowin after the end of his loan deal.

Return to Perth Glory
On 3 January 2012 it was announced that he had returned to A-League club Perth Glory.

Western Sydney Wanderers
On 28 June 2013, it was announced that Heffernan had signed a one-year contract to play for Western Sydney Wanderers, following a short stint with Illawarra Premier League club Dapto Dandaloo Fury.

Managerial career
On 24 April 2019 Heffernan was appointed the manager of the Western Sydney Wanderers in the W-league.

Career statistics

1Includes A-League Pre-Season Challenge Cup.

International career
Heffernan was selected to be part of the Socceroos in the Australia versus Argentina game on 11 September 2007. He got his first senior international cap on 28 January 2009 in an AFC Asian Cup qualifying match versus Indonesia at the Bung Karno Stadium in Jakarta. He was then again selected for the Socceroos in January 2010 in an AFC Asian Cup qualifying match versus Kuwait. Heffernan scored in the fifth minute to open his international scoring account and help his side to a 2–2 draw.

Honours
Central Coast Mariners
 A-League Premiership: 2007–08

References

External links
 
 Oz Football profile

1980 births
Association football fullbacks
Australia international soccer players
Australian expatriate sportspeople in England
Australian expatriate sportspeople in Germany
A-League Men players
Western Sydney Wanderers FC players
National Soccer League (Australia) players
1. FC Nürnberg II players
Central Coast Mariners FC players
Melbourne City FC players
Sydney United 58 FC players
Perth Glory FC players
Liaoning F.C. players
Chinese Super League players
Wollongong Wolves FC players
Huddersfield Town A.F.C. players
English Football League players
Expatriate footballers in Germany
Expatriate footballers in China
Australian expatriate soccer players
Soccer players from Sydney
Living people
National Premier Leagues players
Australian soccer players